Sidney George Purkis (1938-2008), was a male athlete who competed for England.

Athletics career
He represented England in the 880 yards at the 1962 British Empire and Commonwealth Games in Perth, Western Australia.

He joined Romford Athletics Club in 1956 and finished as runner up in the AA’s 880 yards track championship and represented Great Britain in the 1962 European Athletics Championships in the Men's 800 metres. He later joined Thurrock Harriers.

References

1938 births
2008 deaths
English male middle-distance runners
Athletes (track and field) at the 1962 British Empire and Commonwealth Games
Commonwealth Games competitors for England